John L. Scott is an American law enforcement official who was serving as the interim Sheriff of Los Angeles County, California from January 30, 2014 to December 1, 2014. Scott was appointed L.A. County's 31st sheriff by the L.A. County Board of Supervisors when his predecessor Lee Baca resigned before the end of his elected term.

Early life and education
Scott holds a bachelor's degree in Management from Redlands University, and a master's degree in Public Communications from Pepperdine University.

Career
Scott joined the Los Angeles County Sheriff's Department in January 1969. As a deputy, he patrolled the Lakewood Station area. In 1974, he was promoted to Sergeant and held assignments at Firestone Station, the Special Enforcement Bureau and the Emergency Operations Bureau. Following his promotion to the rank of Lieutenant in 1984, Commander Scott took assignments at Men's Central Jail, Carson Station, Field Operations Region II Headquarters, the Office of Emergency Management, Employee Relations, and was the Executive Aide to the Assistant Sheriff. In 1995, he took command of Carson Station following his promotion to Captain. In June 2001, he held the rank of Acting Commander, leading the Custody Operations Division, North Facilities. In June 2005, he retired from the Sheriff's Department. In 2008, he came back from retirement and was appointed Undersheriff for the Orange County Sheriff's Department.

Personal life
Scott is married to Alice Scott, who is a retired Captain with the L.A. County Sheriff's Department. Scott has four adult children. 2 with current wife Alice Scott (Benjamin, and Wesley) and 2 with previous wife Elaine Scott (John (aka JD) and Michael). When Scott is off duty, he enjoys skiing, traveling, reading, and various family activities. And he has been a collector of antique vehicles all his life. Specifically the 1957 Chevy Bel Air.

References

External links

Official Announcement of John Scott's appointment to fill the remainder of Baca's term
L.A. County Board of Supervisors Appoints OC Undersheriff John Scott as Interim Los Angeles County Sheriff
 John L. Scott - Resume

Los Angeles County, California sheriffs
20th-century births
Living people
2014 in California
Pepperdine University alumni
University of Redlands alumni
Year of birth missing (living people)